The Comte AC-1 was a 1920s Swiss single-seat monoplane fighter aircraft produced by Flugzeugbau A. Comte.

Design and development
The Swiss company Flugzeugbau A. Comte was established in the early 1920s to build German aircraft designs under licence. The company's first original design was the Comte AC-1, developed to meet a Swiss Fliegertruppe (Swiss Air Force) requirement for a single-seat fighter.

The AC-1 was a high-wing monoplane with fixed tailskid undercarriage.  It was constructed of metal with fabric-covered wing and tail surfaces.  The powerplant was a Gnome et Rhône radial engine driving a fixed-pitched two-blade propeller.

The AC-1 prototype first flew on 1927.  Testing and evaluation did not result in any orders but the prototype was bought by the Swiss Fliegertrupppe.  The prototype was the only unit constructed of this type.

Operational history
The prototype was acquired by the Swiss Fliegetruppe and later had the wing replaced with a wing from a Dewoitine D.9. With the new wing the aircraft was used to establish a Swiss altitude record on 19 November 1928.

Operators

Swiss Fliegertruppe

Specifications (AC-1)

References

Further reading

1920s Swiss fighter aircraft
AC-1
Abandoned military aircraft projects of Switzerland
Single-engined tractor aircraft
Parasol-wing aircraft
Aircraft first flown in 1927